Peruva is a little small village in the Mulakulam panchayat of kottayam

district in Kerala. It is located 35 km from Kottayam and 40 km from Ernakulam. The other nearby towns are piravom (6 km), Kaduthuruthy (8 km),   and Thalayolaparambu (10 km).

Banks & ATM 
 Central Bank of India, branch & ATM
 State Bank of India, branch & ATM (2 Nos)
 Federal Bank, branch & ATM
 Kerala Gramin Bank
 IndusInd Bank

References

External links
 Peruva on Wikimapia

Villages in Kottayam district